Rubai may refer to:

 Li Rubai (1553–1620), a general of the Ming dynasty
 Salim Ali Rubai (1935–1978), head of state of South Yemen
 Rubai (album), an album by the Irish folk band Flook

See also
 Ruba'i